The Athlete is a 1901-1904 black-patina bronze sculpture by the French artist Auguste Rodin It measures 39,4 × 27,5 × 24,3 cm.

Development
The model for it was Samuel Stockton White III, a member of the gymnastics teams at  Princeton University and the University of Cambridge. White recalled:

Similar works
During the same period Rodin also produced The American Athlete, with more exaggerated musculature and its head turned to the right. He presented both works to their model. Despite several variants, they are both lesser-known works of Rodin.

See also
List of sculptures by Auguste Rodin

References

External links

Sculptures by Auguste Rodin
1904 sculptures
Nude sculptures